Garuda Indonesia Flight 542 was a scheduled passenger flight on 3 February 1961, which was reported missing enroute from Surabaya to Balikpapan. All 26 occupants on board were lost in the accident.

Flight
The aircraft departed Surabaya-Juanda Airport at 11:35 pm inbound for Balikpapan. While in cruising altitude, the airplane disappeared from radar screens and presumably crashed into the Java Sea. SAR were conducted but eventually suspended after few days as no trace of the aircraft nor the 26 occupants was found. The crew was unable to send any distress call prior to the accident. Due to a lack of evidence, it was not possible to determine the exact cause of the accident.

References

1961 in Indonesia
Aviation accidents and incidents in 1961
Aviation accidents and incidents in Indonesia
Flight 542
February 1961 events in Asia
1961 disasters in Indonesia